John Abner Race (May 12, 1914 – November 9, 1983) was a member of the United States House of Representatives from Wisconsin.

He was born in Fond du Lac, Wisconsin and graduated from Fond du Lac High School and attended the University of Wisconsin–Madison School for Workers. In 1958, Race was elected to the Fond du Lac County, Wisconsin Board of Supervisors. He ran unsuccessfully against Earl F. McEssy for the Wisconsin State Assembly in 1958. He also served on the state vocations board. He came to Congress on the coattails of Lyndon B. Johnson in 1964 as part of the 89th Congress when the Democrats gained a net of 36 seats. From 1965 to 1967 Race served on the House Committee of Interior and Insular Affairs. He was defeated for reelection to the 90th United States Congress in 1966 by William A. Steiger and also defeated in his run for the Wisconsin State Assembly in 1970.

Race was in the machine tool industry, where he operated a crane for the Giddings & Lewis company, and was involved in the labor union, serving as chairman of the bargaining and grievance committee of Local Lodge 1420 of the International Association of Machinists and Aerospace Workers. He was heavily involved with local units of the Democratic Party. He died in Fond du Lac and is interred at the Estabrooks Cemetery, Fond du Lac, Wisconsin.

Notes

Sources

The Fighting Machinists, A Century of Struggle, by Robert G. Rodden
United States House elections, 1964

External links
 

County supervisors in Wisconsin
1914 births
1983 deaths
Politicians from Fond du Lac, Wisconsin
University of Wisconsin–Madison alumni
Democratic Party members of the United States House of Representatives from Wisconsin
Burials in Wisconsin
20th-century American politicians